= 1924 Liechtenstein tax law referendum =

Referendum in Liechtenstein

27 April 1924
- Referendum on a 1924 tax law

Results
Choice	Votes	%
Yes	1,088	64.53%
No	598	35.47%
Valid votes	1,686	92.33%
Invalid or blank votes	140	7.67%
Total votes	1,826	100.00%
Registered voters/turnout	2,032	89.86%

A referendum on a tax law was held in Liechtenstein on 27 April 1924. It was approved by 65% of voters.

== Results ==
Choice	Votes	%
For	1,088	64.53
Against	598	35.47
Total	1,686	100.00
Valid votes	1,686	92.33
Invalid/blank votes	140	7.67
Total votes	1,826	100.00
Registered voters/turnout	2,032	89.86
Source: Nohlen & Stöver
